En la boca del lobo (English: Into the Wolf's Mouth) is a Colombian telenovela produced by Sony Pictures Television and Teleset for RCN Televisión and UniMás. Based on the book En la boca del lobo: La historia jamás contada del hombre que hizo caer el cartel de Cali from William C. Rempel.

Plot 
En la boca del lobo tells the story of the man responsible for the fall of one of the most powerful cartels of all time. The story focuses on Ricardo Salgado (Luis Fernando Hoyos), an engineer and soldier who became in charge of the security of the godfather of the Cali Cartel, one of the largest criminal organizations in the world and rival of the Medellin Cartel.

Cast

References

External links 

2014 telenovelas
Colombian telenovelas
RCN Televisión telenovelas
Spanish-language telenovelas
2014 Colombian television series debuts
2015 Colombian television series endings
2014 American television series debuts
2015 American television series endings
Television shows set in Colombia
Works about Colombian drug cartels